Uchana Kalan Assembly constituency in Jind district is one of the 90 Vidhan Sabha constituencies of Haryana state in northern India.
 
It is part of Hisar Lok Sabha constituency.

Members of Legislative Assembly

See also

 Haryana Legislative Assembly
 Elections in Haryana
 Elections in India
 Lok Sabha
 Rajya Sabha
 Election Commission of India

References

External links
 Chief Election Officer, Haryana

Assembly constituencies of Haryana
Jind district